The "Defender of the Motherland" Medal is a commemorative medal awarded by Ukraine.  It was established on 8 October 1999 by presidential decree № 1299.

Criteria 
An award of the President of Ukraine, the "Defender of the Motherland" Medal is awarded to war veterans, who live in Ukraine, as well as citizens of other countries which participated in the liberation of Ukraine from Nazi occupation. It may also be awarded to other citizens of Ukraine for personal courage and bravery while protecting the public interest, and strengthening the defense and security of Ukraine.

The medal is awarded by decree of the President of Ukraine. It is presented by the President, heads of central and local executive power bodies, leaders of military formations and foreign representatives. The medal may be awarded posthumously. The "Defender of the Motherland" Medal may be revoked by the President of Ukraine in cases of the recipient being convicted of a grave crime.

References 

Orders, decorations, and medals of Ukraine
Awards established in 1999
1999 establishments in Ukraine